Mormonism Unveiled; or The Life and Confessions of the Late Mormon Bishop, John D. Lee (Written by Himself) is a book by John D. Lee, first published in 1877, just after the author's execution for his complicity in the Mountain Meadows massacre. It was dictated to, and edited by, Lee's attorney, William W. Bishop.

The book was composed between Lee's second trial (with its subsequent conviction) and his execution. It includes Lee's autobiography up until 1847, his confession to Bishop, the transcript of the 1876 trial, an account of Lee's death by firing squad, and a biographical sketch of Brigham Young. Lee portrays himself as a true believer who was set up as a scapegoat by Young and other church leaders.

Some details have been brought into question, if they were not Lee's words, but rather inserted by the editor.

The book was out of print for almost a century.

References

External links
 Text of Mormonism Unveiled at Archive.org

Mountain Meadows Massacre
History books about the American Old West
History books about the Latter Day Saint movement
American autobiographies
LDS non-fiction
1877 non-fiction books
Books published posthumously